Obručné is a village and municipality in Stará Ľubovňa District in the Prešov Region of northern Slovakia.

History
In historical records the village was first mentioned in 1656.

Geography
The municipality lies at an altitude of 655 metres and covers an area of 5.860 km2. It has a population of about 52 people.

External links
http://www.statistics.sk/mosmis/eng/run.html

Villages and municipalities in Stará Ľubovňa District
Šariš